Yery with breve (Ы̆ ы̆; italics: Ы̆ ы̆) is a letter of the Cyrillic script.

Yery with breve is used in the old Mari language and the Moksha dialect of Mordvin.

See also
Cyrillic characters in Unicode

References